In commutative algebra, an étale algebra over a field is a special type of algebra, one that is isomorphic to a finite product of finite separable field extensions.  These may also be called separable algebras, though the latter term is sometimes used in a broader sense.

Definitions 

Let  be a field.  Let  be a commutative unital associative -algebra.  Then  is called an étale -algebra if any one of the following equivalent conditions holds:

Examples
The -algebra  is étale because it is a finite separable field extension.

The -algebra  is not étale, since .

Properties

Then the category of étale -algebras is equivalent to the category of finite -sets with continuous -action. These globalize to e.g. the definition of étale fundamental groups and categorify to Grothendieck's Galois theory.

Notes

References

 http://www.jmilne.org/math/CourseNotes/FT.pdf

Commutative algebra